William 'Will' Henry Rist (born 22 March 1987) is a former English first-class cricketer.

While studying at Anglia Ruskin University, Rist made three appearances in first-class cricket for the Cambridge UCCE. He made two appearances against Northamptonshire and Essex in 2007, with a further appearance against Essex in 2008. He scored 24 runs in his three matches, with a high score of 11. In addition to playing first-class cricket for Cambridge UCCE, Rist also played minor counties cricket for Norfolk, making two appearances in the 2006 Minor Counties Championship.

References

External links
 

1987 births
Living people
People from Guildford
Alumni of Anglia Ruskin University
English cricketers
Cambridge MCCU cricketers
Norfolk cricketers